Hradčanská is a Prague Metro station on Line A, between Dejvická and Malostranská stations. It is named after Hradčany, the district where Prague Castle is located (hrad means "castle" in Czech). However, the Castle itself is 10 minutes away walking from the station. This station originally had only one exit toward Milady Horákové street.  It now has multiple exits on this street, on each site of the tram tracks.  There is now also an exit directly onto Dejvická street.

The station was opened on 12 August 1978 as part of the inaugural section of Line A, between Leninova and Náměstí Míru.

The station vestibule, which extends under the tram stop, and into which the escalator tunnel enters directly in the middle, is lined with yellow stone. It has a Czech lion carved into it and an inscription reading "Veškerá moc v ČSSR patří pracujícímu lidu" ("All power in the CSSR belongs to the working people").

References

External links 
 Gallery and information (English)

Prague Metro stations
Railway stations opened in 1978
1978 establishments in Czechoslovakia
Railway stations in the Czech Republic opened in the 20th century